Maurizio Zanolla also known as Manolo (born in Feltre, 16 February 1958) is an Italian rock climber and mountaineer.

Climbing career
Manolo came to international attention with his free solos in the Dolomites. In 1986, he became one of the first Italians to climb a route of grade  with l'Ultimo Movimento in Totog in the Pale di San Martino. In 1992, he became one of the first Italians to free solo a grade , with Masala Dosa on the wall of "San Silvestro" in 1992. In 1981, with Alessandro Gogna, he climbed the Aguglia of Goloritzè in Sardinia, initiating the original development of the Selvaggio Blu trekking route.

Notable routes

Redpoint 
 9a+/5.15a:
 Bimbaluna - Saint-Loup (SUI) - 20 January 2008 - a repeat of the route that Fred Nicole freed in 2004
 9a/5.14d:
 Eternit - Vette Feltrine/Baule (ITA) - 24 August 2009 - first ascent, continue of O ce l'hai...o ne hai bisogno
  - Saint-Loup (SUI) - 2006 - repeat on a route Fred Nicole freed in 1993
 8c+/5.14c:
 Roby Present - Val Noana (ITA) - 24 March 2012 - first ascent, route Roberto Bassi
 8c/5.14b:
 Eroi Fragili - Val Noana (ITA) - 5 March 2011 - first ascent
 Stramonio - Val Noana (ITA) - 10 October 2010, first ascent
 Thin ice - Terlago (ITA) - 25 April 2009 - route Nico Favresse, 2007
 El sior Favonio - Fonzaso (ITA) - 2006 - first ascent
 Diabloluna - Fonzaso (ITA) - 2006
 L'Arte di Salire in Alto - Celva (ITA) - 2001 - route Rolando Larcher in 1992
 The Dream - Val Noana (ITA) - October 1991 - first ascent
 8b+/5.14a:
 Appigli Ridicoli - Vette Feltrine/Baule (ITA) - 1990 - nowadays graded as 9a
 Il Maratoneta - Paklenica (CRO) - 1988
 Malvasia - Dvigrad (CRO) - 1988
 8b/5.13d:
 O ce l'hai… o ne hai bisogno - Vette Feltrine/Baule (ITA) - 1990
 Ultimo Movimento - Totoga (ITA) - 1986 - first ascent and first Italian 8b ever

On sight 
 8b+/5.14a:
 Rock and Blues - Kalymnos (GRE) - 19 June 2009

Free solo 
 8a/5.13b:
 Masala Dosa in Totoga, in San Silvestro cliff - 1992

1958 births
Living people
Italian rock climbers